A clay court is one of the types of tennis court on which the sport of tennis, originally known as "lawn tennis", is played. Clay courts are made of crushed stone, brick, shale, or other unbound mineral aggregate depending on the tournament. 

The French Open uses clay courts, the only Grand Slam tournament to do so. Clay courts are more common in Continental Europe and Latin America than in North America, Asia-Pacific or Britain. 
Two main types exist: red clay, the more common variety, and green clay, also known as "rubico", which is a harder surface. Although less expensive to construct than other types of tennis courts, the maintenance costs of clay are high as the surface must be rolled to preserve flatness.

Play
Clay courts are considered "slow" because the balls bounce relatively high and lose much of their initial speed when contacting the surface, making it more difficult for a player to deliver an unreturnable shot. Points are usually longer as there are fewer winners. Therefore, clay courts heavily favor baseliners who are consistent and have a strong defensive game, which has allowed players such as Rafael Nadal, Björn Borg, Chris Evert, and Justine Henin to find success at the French Open. Players who excel on clay courts but struggle to replicate the same form on fast courts are known as clay-court specialists. Clay-court players generally play in a semicircle about  behind the baseline. Clay courts favor the "full western grip" for more topspin. Clay court players use topspins to throw off their opponents. 

Movement on the loose surface is very different from movement on any other surface; playing on clay often involves the ability to slide into the ball during the stroke.

Clay courts are unique in that the ball bounce leaves an impression in the ground, which can help determine whether a shot was in or out. Critics of red clay courts point to the constant need to wet them down, problems renewing the surface if it dries out, and the damage caused to clothing and footwear through stains. All clay courts, not just red clay, tend to cause a build-up of clay on the bottom of the shoes of the players, needing frequent removal.

Variants

Red clay
Almost all red clay courts are made not of natural clay but of crushed brick that is packed to make the court, with the top most layers consisting of finely crushed loose particles. Such courts are most common in Europe and Latin America. The exact color of the surface varies with the composition of the bricks used, and can appear from a light yellow to a deep red, with a medium orange being most common.

En tout cas (French for "in any case") is a version of red clay with a coarser top layer to improve drainage. The coarser surface allows more water to run through the surface of the court drying the surface more quickly after rain.

Natural clay courts are rare because this type of surface does not absorb water easily and takes two to three days to dry. A good example of natural red clay can be seen at the Frick Park Clay Courts in Pittsburgh, a public facility of six red clay courts that has been in continual use since 1930.

The Copa Sevilla Open is played on yellow clay courts due to the kind of crushed brick used in its composition. While composed in the same way as red clay, it is a noticeably bright yellow and visually distinct from other red clay type courts.

Green clay

Green clay, also known by brand names such as Har-Tru and Rubico, is made of crushed metabasalt rather than brick, making the surface slightly harder and faster than red clay. These courts are located primarily in the mid-Atlantic and southern United States. They are also found in Central and Eastern Canada. There is one WTA tournament played on green Har-Tru clay courts, the Charleston Open in Charleston, South Carolina. From 1975 until 1977, the US Open was played on Har-Tru clay courts.

The US Men's Clay Court Championships are played on clay that has a maroon color. Not only is this a darker color than other clay courts used in the professional game, but it is also a type of Har-Tru court, meaning it is actually composed of the same substance (basalt) as green clay courts, and not a type of red clay.

Players
In the pre-open era Anthony Wilding is particularly notable for his achievements on clay courts. Starting in May 1910 at the Championship of South Africa and ending in June 1914 at the World Hard Court Championships he registered 120 consecutive clay court match victories. 
 
Rafael Nadal, winner of a record 14 French Open men's singles titles, is noted for his success on clay; since his debut in 2005, he has only lost three times at the tournament – in 2009, 2015 and 2021. Nadal holds the record for the longest winning streak by any male player on a single surface since the Open Era began in 1968: 81 clay court wins between April 2005 and May 2007. He also holds the record for most clay court titles in the Open Era, with 63. Guillermo Vilas won 49 of his 62 singles titles on clay. He only won a single French Open title, although he also won the US Open in 1977 while it was held on clay. Thomas Muster is also considered a successful clay court player; although he also only won the French Open once, 40 out of his 44 career singles titles were won on clay.

On the women's side, Justine Henin and Monica Seles hold the open era record for the number of consecutive French Open titles won at three (1990–1992 for Seles and 2005–2007 for Henin). In the pre-open era this feat was first achieved by Helen Wills Moody (1928–1930) and followed by Hilde Krahwinkel Sperling (1935–1937).

Chris Evert holds the record for longest winning streak on clay for either gender in the open era: from August 1973 to May 1979, she won 125 consecutive clay court matches. During this time, Evert skipped three editions of the French Open (1976–78), to participate in World Team Tennis. She also has the highest career win percentage on clay courts (94.28%) during the open era.

The most successful currently active female player on clay is Serena Williams, who won the French Open in 2002, 2013 and 2015. In 2013, Williams went undefeated throughout the clay court season, winning five titles on the surface.

Clay-court specialist

A clay-court specialist is a tennis player who excels on clay courts, more than on any other surface.

Due in part to advances in racquet technology, current clay-court specialists are known for employing long, winding groundstrokes that generate heavy topspin; such strokes are less effective on faster surfaces on which the balls do not bounce as high. Clay-court specialists tend to slide more effectively on clay than other players. Many of them are also very adept at hitting the drop shot, which can be effective because rallies on clay courts often leave players pushed far beyond the baseline. Additionally, the slow, long rallies require a great degree of mental focus and physical stamina.

The definition of "clay-court specialist" has varied. Anthony Wilding, Sergi Bruguera, Albert Costa and Gastón Gaudio were French Open champions who won all or nearly all of their career titles on clay. Andrés Gimeno, Adriano Panatta, Manuel Orantes, Yannick Noah, Michael Chang, Thomas Muster, Gustavo Kuerten, Carlos Moyá and Juan Carlos Ferrero won major titles only on
clay, but won lower tournaments, including Masters Series events, on other surfaces. Among female players, there have been few whose best results were confined exclusively to clay. Virginia Ruzici, Anastasia Myskina, Iva Majoli, Sue Barker, Ana Ivanovic, Francesca Schiavone, Jeļena Ostapenko, and Barbora Krejčíková are the only female players to have won major titles at only the French Open since the beginning of the open era.

Increasingly, clay courters have attempted to play better on other surfaces with some success. Ferrero reached the US Open Final in 2003, the same year he won the French Open, and also won several hardcourt tournaments. Nadal was considered a clay court specialist until a string of successes on other surfaces, including completing a Double Career Grand Slam and a Career Golden Slam, led to a broadening of his reputation, 2016 French Open winner Garbiñe Muguruza reached the 2015 Wimbledon final and won the 2017 Wimbledon title.

Professional tournaments played on clay
The professional clay court season comprises many more tournaments than the brief grass court season, but is still shorter than the hard court seasons. There are three distinct clay court seasons during the year.

The first is the men's South American clay season. Played primarily in February between the Australian Open and the Indian Wells Masters, the ATP has four tournaments in this swing, although other ATP tournaments played on hardcourt occur the same weeks. The WTA discontinued its participation in Rio de Janeiro after 2016, so there are no clay court women's tournaments during this period.

The second is the long spring clay season that starts in the Americas and Morocco before moving to mainland Europe and finishing with the French Open. It is usually played over two months between April and June, after the Miami Open. Unlike the other two clay seasons, this swing does not share the majority of its time with simultaneous hard court tournaments.

The third is the brief summer clay season that takes place after Wimbledon. It is entirely in Europe, and usually takes place in July. Near the end of the swing, it overlaps with the beginning of the US Open Series.

South American clay season

Spring clay season

Summer clay season

See also

Hardcourt
Grass court
Carpet court

References

Tennis court surfaces

Clay